Kabongo is a town in eastern Democratic Republic of the Congo. It is also the seat of the current muLopwe (Grand Chief or King) of the Kabongo lineage of the Baluba royal line, Kumwimba Kabongo Kansh'imbu. It is within a few miles of the historical capital of the Luba Kingdom.

Transport 
It is served by a station on a branch of the national railway network.

See also 
 Railway stations in DRCongo

References 

Populated places in Haut-Lomami